3,5-Dinitrosalicylic acid (DNS or DNSA, IUPAC name 2-hydroxy-3,5-dinitrobenzoic acid) is an aromatic compound that reacts with reducing sugars and other reducing molecules to form 3-amino-5-nitrosalicylic acid, which strongly absorbs light at 540 nm. It was first introduced as a method to detect reducing substances in urine by James B. Sumner and has since been widely used, for example, for quantifying carbohydrate levels in blood. It is mainly used in assay of alpha-amylase. However, enzymatic methods are usually preferred due to DNS lack of specificity.

Synthesis 
3,5-Dinitrosalicylic acid can be prepared by the nitration of salicylic acid.

References

Dinitrophenols
Salicylic acids